Rathganny is a townland in County Westmeath, Ireland.

Rathganny is one of 14 townlands of the civil parish of Multyfarnham in the barony of Corkaree in the Province of Leinster.

The neighbouring townlands are: Ballynaclonagh, Lackan and Soho to the north, Abbeyland, Ballindurrow, Multyfarnham and Multyfarnham or Fearbranagh to the east, Heathland  to the south and Fulmort to the west.

In the 1911 census of Ireland there were 20 houses and 83 inhabitants in the townland.

References

External links
Rathganny at the IreAtlas Townland Data Base
Rathganny at Townlands.ie
Rathganny at Logainm.ie

Townlands of County Westmeath